Soufiane Sahbaoui (born 14 August 1995) is a Moroccan cyclist.

Major results

2013
 3rd Time trial, National Junior Road Championships
2015
 1st Stage 2 Tour d'Egypte
 3rd Road race, National Under-23 Road Championships
 5th Grand prix de Ben Guerir, Challenge des phosphates
2016
 Challenge du Prince
1st Trophée de l'Anniversaire
6th Trophée Princier
 7th Overall Tour de Tunisie
 9th Overall Grand Prix Chantal Biya
1st Stage 3
2017
 2nd  Road race, Jeux de la Francophonie
 Challenge du Prince
3rd Trophée de la Maison Royale
10th Trophée Princier
 Les Challenges de la Marche Verte
4th GP Sakia El Hamra
7th GP Al Massira
 5th Overall La Tropicale Amissa Bongo
1st  Young rider classification
 6th Overall Tour du Maroc
 9th Time trial, African Road Championships

References

External links

1995 births
Living people
Moroccan male cyclists